Sasanian Iberia (Middle Persian: 𐭥𐭫𐭥𐭰𐭠𐭭, wirōzān/wiruzān/wiručān) refers to the period the Kingdom of Iberia (Kartli, eastern Georgia) was under the suzerainty of the Sasanian Empire. The period includes when it was ruled by Marzbans (governors) appointed by the Sasanid Iranian king, and later through the Principality of Iberia.

History
The Georgian kingdoms were contested between the Sasanids and the neighboring rivalling Roman-Byzantine Empire ever since the 3rd century. Over the span of the next hundreds of years, both the Byzantines and the Sasanids managed to establish hegemony over these regions. At the few remaining times, the Georgian kings managed to retain their autonomy. Sasanian governance was established for the first time early on in the Sasanian era, during the reign of king Shapur I (r. 240-270). In 284, the Sasanians secured the Iberian throne for an Iranian prince from the House of Mihran, subsequently known by his dynastic name Mirian III. Mirian III became thus the first head of this branch of the Mihranid family in the Kingdom of Iberia, known as the Chosroid dynasty (otherwise known as the Iberian Mihranids, or Mihranids of Iberia), whose members would rule Iberia into the sixth century. In 363, Sasanian suzerainty was restored by king Shapur II (r. 309-379) when he invaded Iberia and installed Aspacures II as his vassal on the Iberian throne.

The continuing rivalry between Byzantium and Sasanian Persia for supremacy in the Caucasus, and the unsuccessful insurrection (523) of the Georgians under Gurgen had severe consequences for the country. Thereafter, the king of Iberia had only nominal power, while the country was effectively ruled by the Persians. By the time of Vezhan Buzmihr's tenure as marzban of Iberia, the hagiographies of the period implied that the "kings" in Tbilisi had only the status of mamasakhlisi, which means "head of the (royal) house". When Bakur III died in 580, the Sassanid government of Persia under Hormizd IV (578-590) seized on the opportunity to abolish the Iberian monarchy. Iberia became a Persian province, administrated through its direct rule by appointed marzbans, which in fact was, as Prof. Donald Rayfield states; "a de jure continuation of de facto abolition of Iberian kingship since the 520s".

The Iberian nobles acquiesced to this change without resistance, while the heirs of the royal house withdrew to their highland fortresses – the main Chosroid line in Kakheti, and the younger Guaramid branch in Klarjeti and Javakheti. However, the direct Persian control brought about heavy taxation and an energetic promotion of Zoroastrianism in a largely Christian country. Therefore, when the Eastern Roman emperor Maurice embarked upon a military campaign against Persia in 582, the Iberian nobles requested that he helped restore the monarchy. Maurice did respond, and, in 588, sent his protégé, Guaram I of the Guaramids, as a new ruler to Iberia. However, Guaram was not crowned as king, but recognized as a presiding prince and bestowed with the Eastern Roman title of curopalates. The Byzantine-Sassanid treaty of 591 confirmed this new rearrangement, but left Iberia divided into Roman- and Sassanid-dominated parts at the town of Tbilisi. Mtskheta came to be under Byzantine control.

Guaram's successor, the second presiding prince Stephen I (Stephanoz I), reoriented his politics towards Persia in a quest to reunite a divided Iberia, a goal he seems to have accomplished, but this cost him his life when the Byzantine emperor Heraclius attacked Tbilisi in 626, during the Byzantine–Sasanian War of 602–628, marking the definite Byzantine predominance in most of Georgia by 627-628 at the expense of the Sasanids until the Muslim conquest of Persia.

Sasanian governors of Iberia

 Piran Gushnasp
 Arvand Gushnasp
 Vezhan Buzmihr

See also
 Atashgah of Tbilisi
 Roman Georgia
 Muslim conquest of Persia
 Principality of Iberia
 Arab rule in Georgia

References

Sources
 
 
 
 
 
 
 

Iberia
Kingdom of Iberia